The Roman Catholic Diocese of Lages is a Latin rite suffragan diocese in the Ecclesiastical province of Florianópolis in Santa Catarina state, Brazil.

Its cathedral episcopal see is Catedral Nossa Senhora dos Prazeres, dedicated to Our Lady of Joy, in the city of Lages.

Statistics 
As per 2015, it pastorally served 332,700 Catholics (85.5% of 389,000 total population) on 18,152 km² in 25 parishes with 57 priests (41 diocesan, 16 religious), 12 deacons, 163 lay religious (16 brothers, 147 sisters) and 10 seminarians.

History 
 17 January 1927: Established as Diocese of Lages, on territory split off from the then Diocese of Santa Caterina (now its Metropolitan Florianopolis)
 It lost territory repeatedly : on 1933.12.09 to establish the Territorial Prelature of Palmas (now Diocese of Palmas-Francisco Beltrão), on 1958.01.14 to establish the Diocese of Chapecó, on 1968.11.23 to establish the Diocese of Caçador and on 1975.06.12 to establish the Diocese of Joaçaba.

Bishops
(all Roman rite )

Episcopal Ordinaries
Suffragan Bishops of Lages 
 Daniel Henrique Hostin, Order of Friars Minor (O.F.M.) (Brazilian?) (1929.08.02 – death 1973.11.17)
 Auxiliary Bishop : Alfonso Niehues (1959.01.08 – 1965.08.03), Titular Bishop of Eurœa in Epiro (1959.01.08 – 1965.08.03); next Titular Archbishop of Aptuca (1965.08.03 – 1967.05.18) as Coadjutor Archbishop of Florianópolis (Brazil) (1965.08.03 – 1967.05.18), succeeding as Metropolitan Archbishop of Florianópolis (1967.05.18 – retired 1991.01.23), died 1993
 Auxiliary Bishop : Carlos Schmitt, O.F.M. (1970.02.14 – retired 1974), Titular Bishop of Sufar (1970.02.14 – resigned 1971.03.16), died 2006; previously Bishop of Dourados (Brazil) (1960.08.29 – 1970.02.14)
 Honorato Piazera, Dehonians (S.C.I.) (1973.11.17 – retired 1987.02.18), died 1990; previously Titular Bishop of Termessus (1959.07.11 – 1961.12.14) as Auxiliary Bishop of Archdiocese of São Sebastião do Rio de Janeiro (Brazil) (1959.07.11 – 1961.12.14), Bishop of Diocese of Nova Iguaçu (Brazil) (1961.12.14 – 1966.02.12), Titular Bishop of Castellum Iabar (1966.02.12 – 1973.11.17) as Coadjutor Bishop of Lages (1966.02.12 – 1973.11.17)
 João Oneres Marchiori (1987.02.18 – retired 2009.11.11), died 2017; previously Bishop of Caçador (Brazil) (1977.01.25 – 1983.04.18), Coadjutor Bishop of Lages (1983.04.18 – succession 1987.02.18)
 Irineu Andreassa, O.F.M. (2009.11.11 - 2016.11.30), next Bishop of Ituiutaba (Brazil) (2016.11.30 –...)
 Guilherme Antônio Werlang, Missionaries of the Holy Family (M.S.F.) (2018.02.07 – ...); previously Bishop of Ipameri (Brazil) (1999.05.19 – 2018.02.07).

Coadjutor bishops
Alfonso Niehues (1959-1965), did not succeed to see; appointed Coadjutor Archbishop of Florianópolis, Santa Catarina
Honorato Piazera, S.C.I. (1966-1973)
João Oneres Marchiori (1983-1987)

Auxiliary bishop
Carlos Stanislau Schmitt, O.F.M. (1971-1973)

Other priest of this diocese who became bishop
Orlando Brandes, appointed Bishop of Joinville in 1994

See also 
 List of Catholic dioceses in Brazil

Sources and external links 
 GCatholic.org, with Google satellite map & HQ photo - data for all sections
 diocesan website 
 Catholic Hierarchy

Roman Catholic dioceses in Brazil
Roman Catholic Ecclesiastical Province of Florianópolis
Religious organizations established in 1927
Roman Catholic dioceses and prelatures established in the 20th century